

2000 Men's Basketball Cup

The 2000 Men's Basketball Cup was contested by five teams and won by Petro Atlético. The final was played on April 16, 2000.

The 2000 Angola Women's Basketball Cup was contested by Primeiro de Agosto and Grupo Desportivo da Nocal, with Primeiro de Agosto winning the match and subsequently the trophy.

Preliminary round

Semi-finals

Final

2000 Women's Basketball Cup

See also
 2000 Angola Basketball Super Cup
 2000 BAI Basket

References

Angola Basketball Cup seasons
Cup